Maurice Vanderleenden (27 September 1893 – May 1971) was a Belgian wrestler. He competed in the Greco-Roman middleweight event at the 1920 Summer Olympics.

References

External links
 

1893 births
1971 deaths
Olympic wrestlers of Belgium
Wrestlers at the 1920 Summer Olympics
Belgian male sport wrestlers
Place of birth missing